The Framingham State Rams football team represents Framingham State University in college football at the NCAA Division III level. The Rams are members of the Massachusetts State Collegiate Athletic Conference, having joined in 2013. The Rams play their home games at Bowditch Field in Framingham, Massachusetts. 

Their head coach is Tom Kelley, who took over the position for the 2007 season.

Conference affiliations
 Club team (1972–1973)
 New England Football Conference (1974–2012)
 Massachusetts State Collegiate Athletic Conference (2013–present)

List of head coaches

Key

Coaches

Year-by-year results

See also
 Framingham State Rams

Notes

References

External links
 

 
American football teams established in 1972
1972 establishments in Massachusetts